Monaco competed at the 2020 Summer Olympics in Tokyo. Originally scheduled to take place from 24 July to 9 August 2020, the Games were rescheduled for 23 July to 8 August 2021, due to the COVID-19 pandemic. Since the nation's official debut in 1920, Monegasque athletes have appeared in every edition of the Summer Olympic Games throughout the modern era, except for three occasions; Monaco did not attend the 1932 Summer Olympics in Los Angeles at the period of the worldwide Great Depression, failed to register any athletes at the 1956 Summer Olympics in Melbourne, and also joined the United States-led boycott when Moscow hosted the 1980 Summer Olympics.

Competitors
The following is the list of number of competitors in the Games.

Athletics

Monaco received a universality slot from the World Athletics to send a female track and field athlete to the Olympics.

Track & road events

Judo

Monaco entered one male judoka into the Olympic tournament after International Judo Federation awarded them a tripartite invitation quota.

Rowing

Monaco received an invitation from the Tripartite Commission to send a rower in the men's single sculls to the Tokyo regatta, signifying the nation's return to the sport for the first time since London 2012.

Qualification Legend: FA=Final A (medal); FB=Final B (non-medal); FC=Final C (non-medal); FD=Final D (non-medal); FE=Final E (non-medal); FF=Final F (non-medal); SA/B=Semifinals A/B; SC/D=Semifinals C/D; SE/F=Semifinals E/F; QF=Quarterfinals; R=Repechage

Swimming

Monaco received a universality invitation from FINA to send two top-ranked swimmers (one per gender) in their respective individual events to the Olympics, based on the FINA Points System of June 28, 2021.

Table tennis

Monaco entered one athlete into the table tennis competition for the first time at the Games. Chinese-born Xiaoxin Yang scored a fourth-match final triumph to book one of the five available places in the women's singles at the 2021 ITTF World Qualification Tournament in Doha, Qatar.

References

External links 

Nations at the 2020 Summer Olympics
Monaco at the Summer Olympics by year
2021 in Monégasque sport